Olivier Giacomotto (born 2 February 1976 in Bordeaux, France) is a French electronic music producer and disc jockey (DJ), also known as Superskank, Ohmme, or OG.

Born in Bordeaux, France, he started his career in 1999, first entering the world of production by working in recording studios, where he learned the use of samplers, mixing desks, effects, computers and music software. From Blues Café studio in Paris to Townhouse Studios in London, Olivier worked with Robert Suhas, Magnus Fiennes, Guy Pratt, Yohad Nevo, Pete Lewis, John Themis, Bond, Lyrics, and various other bands, producers, studio musicians and sound engineers.

After moving back to Bordeaux, he programmed break-beat, drum'n'bass, triphop, hip-hop, lounge, and ambient in electronic projects like Shagshag, Dubweisers or Uprock Massive. During the year 2002 with Shagshag, he won a remix contest organized by News and had his first vinyl release: Plastyc Buddha - Rhodes Royce (Shagshag Remix)

Giacomotto progressively found his path into electronic dance music and its sub-genres like techno, electro, house, tech-house, deep house, Melodic House & Techno. He released his work on independent labels such as Definitive Recordings, Plus 8, Toolroom, Noir Music, Tronic, Yoshitoshi Recordings, Get Physical Music, Great Stuff Records, Suara, Terminal M, Eleatics Records, Atlant. Meanwhile, he continued to perform around the world as DJ: his mixing sessions can be described as sexy, funky, punchy and groovy.

Since 2006, thanks to the success of his productions and remixes such as "Volta", "Gail In The O", "Guacamoli", and "I'll Be OK", his name has regularly appeared in the "Top 10" charts of Beatport, the biggest online music store specializing in electronic dance music. The multinational developer and publisher, Rockstar Games, licensed four of his tracks for the top-selling video game, Midnight Club Los Angeles: "Wasabi On Top", "Good", "Sofa King", and "Too Cool For Skool". He also produced for pop and reggae artists Terry Lynn and Tom Frager. One of his productions for Terry Lynn titled "Stone" was licensed for the soundtrack of Hollywood box office hit Date Night with Steve Carell, Tina Fey, and Mark Wahlberg. "Give Me That Love", co-produced with Tom Frager on Universal, charted for 2 weeks in the French "Top 50", with thousands of singles and albums sold.

Between 2006 and 2016, he co-ran the independent label Definitive Recordings with John Acquaviva, and worked on various kinds of music projects around the world. In 2016, he composed the soundtrack to a full length feature film and multi award-winning horror movie  The Red Man.

Notes

References 
 http://www.beatport.com/artist/olivier-giacomotto/9368.
 Plastyc Buddha - Rhods Royce (Shagshag Remix)
 The Red Man

External links
 
 Olivier Giacomotto Music on Beatport
 Olivier Giacomotto Music on Soundcloud
 Instagram
 Definitive Website

1976 births
French electronic musicians
Living people
Musicians from Bordeaux